Nanfeng station may refer to:

 Nanfeng station (Guangzhou Metro), a light rail station in Guangzhou, China
 Nanfeng station (Hangzhou Metro), a metro station in Hangzhou, China